Naissaar is an island in Estonia. It is situated in the Gulf of Finland, northwest of the capital city Tallinn, and is administratively part of the Viimsi parish. The island consists predominantly of coniferous forest and piles of stones and boulders. In 2020, the island had a population of 17; in 2011 the island had 35 or so permanent residents and some summer residents. Administratively the island is divided into three villages: Lõunaküla (Storbyn), Tagaküla (Bakbyn), and Väikeheinamaa (Lillängin).

Until World War II, the island's native population numbered about 450 people of Estonian-Swedish origin. However, all of the local residents fled from Naissaar to escape the 1944 Soviet invasion of Estonia. During the 1944–1991 Soviet occupation the island was used by the military and off-limits to the public.

Today, the previous small houses of the Swedish villages are being slowly restored, along with a narrow gauge railway that used to run from the north to the southern tip of the island.

A notable native of the island was Bernhard Schmidt, the German-Estonian optician who invented the Schmidt telescope in 1930.

Lighthouse
Naissaar Lighthouse was first built in 1788, though the present lighthouse dates to 1960. It is 47 meters tall.

History
In the Estonian language the name of the island, Nais-saar, means "island of women", and it is possible that Naissaar is the island the chronicle of Adam of Bremen mentioned around 1075 under the name Terra Feminarum. Estonian Swedish fishermen were well-established on the island by the 15th Century, and the Swedes erected a small fortress there in 1705 during the Great Northern War. After the war Estonia became part of the Russian Empire. A new fortress, with five bastions, was built in 1720, for the defense of Tallinn and St. Petersburg.

An epic single-ship action took place off the north end of the island on  1808 when the 14-gun Russian cutter Opyt put up an heroic though ultimately unsuccessful fight against the British 44-gun frigate .

In 1850 the island's population was 155 people, and by 1858 it had grown to 188, most of whom were Estonian Swedes. Between 1853 and 1856 the inhabitants built a new chapel that was part of the Swedish parish of St. Michael in Tallinn.

The outbreak of World War I stopped most of the planned improvements for the military fortifications of Naissaar. Still, in 1914 the Russian Empire opened a narrow-gauge railway line on the island, with a total trackage of 37.7 km.

During the 1917 February Revolution, Russian battleship Petropavlovsk was based on Naissaar, which had been emptied of its inhabitants in 1914. A new fort was built on the island during World War I, stationing 80-90 Russian sailors. After the Bolsheviks seized power in Petrograd and Tallinn in November 1917, a local "Soviet (council) of Workers and Soldiers' Ambassadors" convened on Naissaar. The council formed a "People's Commissars' Council", which then declared itself "the government" of Naissaar on 17 December 1917. This government included the Commissioners ("ministers") for War, Home Affairs, Labor, Finance, Health, and, later, an Education Commissioner as well. Stepan Petrichenko, an anarcho-syndicalist sailor of Petropavlovsk, was elected Chairman of the Council. The Council declared: "In constitutional terms, Naissaar has been designed to be an independent Soviet republic", naming it the Soviet Republic of Soldiers and Fortress-Builders of Naissaar. The government of the "Soviet republic of Naissaar" was, while not formally recognized as independent, actively supported by the Bolshevik government in mainland Estonia, who sent prisoners to the island "to fortify some of the castles, clear the railroads, carry snow and dig sand." However, after German forces occupied the island on 26 February 1918, the Russian Baltic fleet evacuated itself as well as the island's "government", moving towards Helsinki and then to Kronstadt. Thus the "soviet republic" ceased to exist.

In 1918–1940, the independent Republic of Estonia too used Naissaar as a naval base. In 1934, 450 people lived on the island, of whom 291 were Estonians, most of whom in turn were in the Estonian army. The army of the Republic of Estonia continued to use the railway for military purposes throughout the 1930s.

Although the fortifications on the island date back to Peter the Great's scheme to fortify Reval (Tallinn), the main fortifications on Naissaar now are from the period that followed the Stalinist Soviet invasion and occupation of Estonia during World War II in 1940. The Soviet occupation of Naissaar was ended by the invading Nazi German Wehrmacht in August 1941. When the Red Army reinvaded Estonia in 1944, all of the remaining local Estonian-Swedish population escaped from the new Soviet occupation and took refuge in Sweden.

During the 1944–1991 Soviet occupation, the largest factory for naval mines in the Baltics operated on Naissaar. The Soviet authorities declared the island a military area and off-limits to the public. The Soviets also used the railway to connect the factory to the port.

After Estonia had regained independence in 1991, the last Russian troops left Naissaar in early 1993. They burned the explosives in the naval mines, leaving a multitude of metal casings scattered throughout the island. Many of these were scavenged as scrap iron, but a field of mines is still visible near the wharf at Mädasadam. Another legacy of the former Soviet arms industry is that the soil of the island remains contaminated by oil and heavy metals.

In 1995 Naissaar Landscape Conservation Area was established, covering the entire area of the island.

Gallery

Citations

External links 

"Jalutuskäik saladusliku Naissaare lõunarajal"
Fortress of Naissaar
"Naissaar, Former Soviet Navy Base"
F.F. Raskolnikov, "Tales of Sub-Lieutenant Ilyin. A prisoner of the British"

Estonian islands in the Baltic
States and territories established in 1917
Kreis Harrien
Viimsi Parish
Tourist attractions in Harju County
Former socialist republics